Pontianus may refer to:
 Pontianus of Spoleto, martyr of the 2nd century and patron saint of that city
 Sicinius Pontianus, friend of Apuleius
 Pontianus Africae, 6th-century bishop
 Pontianus of Nicomedia, a character in Deipnosophistae, a 3rd-century work by Athaenaeus

See also
 Ponciano (disambiguation)
 Pons (disambiguation)
 Pontian (disambiguation)
 Pontic (disambiguation)
 Pontine (disambiguation)